The Anatolian beylik of Teke (1321–1423), with its capital at Antalya, was one of the frontier principalities established by Oghuz Turkish clans after the decline of the Seljuk Sultanate of Rûm.

History
The Teke dynasty started with a split of territories between two brothers of the neighboring Beylik of Hamidid dynasty.  Yunus Bey became the first ruler of the beylik.  The inhabitants spoke Anatolian Turkish

Legacy
The Turkish province of Antalya was named the sub-province (sanjak) of Teke until the early years of the Republic of Turkey. The peninsula west of Antalya is called Teke Peninsula.

List of rulers
Yunus Bey (1319–1324)
Mahmud Bey (1324–1328)
Sinânüddin Hızır Bey (1328–1355)	
Dadı Bey (1355–1360)	
Mübârizüddin Mehmed Bey (1360–1380)	
Osman Çelebi (1380–1391)	
(Ottoman rule, 1391–1402)
Osman Çelebi (1402–1421)

See also
Yivli Minare Mosque
List of Sunni Muslim dynasties
Dündar of Hamidoğlu

References

Anatolian beyliks
History of Antalya Province
States and territories established in 1321
States and territories disestablished in 1423